
Vinkeles is a restaurant located in Hotel The Dylan in Amsterdam, Netherlands. It is a fine dining restaurant that was awarded one Michelin star in 2010 and retained that rating until present.

in 2013, GaultMillau awarded the restaurant 17 out of 20 points.

Head chef of Vinkeles is Dennis Kuipers.

Vinkeles is a member of Alliance Gastronomique Neerlandaise.

Name
The restaurant is named after the 18th century painter and engraver Reinier Vinkeles. Vinkeles made an etch from the entrance of a former theatre, burnt down in 1772. At the free space, the Roman Catholic "Ouderen & Armen kantoor" was built. It is now the entrance to the restaurant and the hotel.

See also
List of Michelin starred restaurants in the Netherlands

References 

Restaurants in Amsterdam
Michelin Guide starred restaurants in the Netherlands